Charles Chapel Judson (October 15, 1864 – November 4, 1946) was an American painter and educator. He taught in the Art department at the University of California, Berkeley for two decades.

Early life
Judson was born on October 15, 1864, in Detroit, Michigan, and he grew up in Kansas City, Missouri. He was trained as a painter at the San Francisco School of Design as well as in Paris and Munich.

Career
Judson was the founder of the Art department at the University of California, Berkeley, where he taught from 1902 to 1923, and he was the chair from 1921 to 1923. 

Since the 1890s Judson made visits to the Monterey Peninsula. He was the president of the Carmel Art Association and the Monterey History and Art Association, and a member of the Bohemian Club.

On April 2, 1904, Judson married the daughter of watercolorist Sydney J. Yard. He painted landscapes of the Carmel coastline, sand dunes, rivers, hills, and trees. He signed his work, "C. Chapel Judson."

Death
Judson died on November 4, 1946, in Carmel-by-the-Sea, at age 82. His work can be seen at the Oakland Museum of California.

References

1864 births
1946 deaths
Artists from Detroit
People from Carmel-by-the-Sea, California
San Francisco Art Institute alumni
University of California, Berkeley College of Letters and Science faculty
American male painters
Painters from California
19th-century American painters
19th-century American male artists
20th-century American painters
20th-century American male artists